Unakkaga En Kadhal is a 2010 Tamil language romantic drama film produced, written and directed by Jaykumar. The film stars Vishnupriyan, newcomer Shraddha and newcomer Shravan, with an ensemble cast of Kadhal Vijay, Delhi Ganesh, Rajyalakshmi, Anjali Devi, Soori, Ruksha, S. Bhuvaneswari, Munnar Ramesh, Vaiyapuri and R. Sundarrajan playing supporting roles. It was released on 27 August 2010.

Plot

In a village, Seetha (Shraddha) hails from a middle-class Brahmin family. She lives with her parents Seenu (Delhi Ganesh) and Mangalam (Rajyalakshmi), aunt (Anjali Devi), and cousin Ramu (Vishnupriyan). Ramu is a jobless and naive young man who is madly in love with Seetha since childhood. Seenu promised Ramu that he will marry Seetha. Seetha then gets admission in a college in Chennai. In the meantime, Seetha's family is in deep debt and is under pressure from the local shark Aadhi (Munnar Ramesh) to clear their debts.

In Chennai, Seetha befriends the modern girl Suzan (Ruksha), while her classmate Chakravarthy (Shravan) falls in love with her. One day, Chakravarthy makes fun of Ramu, and an angry Seetha slaps him in return. She tells Chakravarthy that she loves Ramu more than anything and will marry him. Later, a vengeful Chakravarthy abducts the lovers, and with his henchmen, beats Ramu up. A heavily wounded Ramu is rushed to the hospital and the doctors, ask for a huge amount of money to save his life. Seetha first files a complaint against Chakravarthy. A desperate Seetha then goes to Suzan's house to seek help, but Suzan's mother (S. Bhuvaneswari) drugs Seetha, and she is raped in her sleep. Thereafter, Ramu is saved, but Suzan's mother forces Seetha to come home. Chakravarthy reveals that he is the one who raped her and it was his master plan to take revenge on her. With his influence, Chakravarthy makes the innocent Seetha get arrested for prostitution. The news of Seetha being arrested for prostitution spreads like fire; thus, it tarnished the reputation of her family, and her family committed suicide. When the police come to know that Seetha is innocent, they release her without delay.

When Ramu and Seetha try to leave the village to live together, Chakravarthy stops their car and attempts to kill them. During the fight, Ramu is killed by Chakravarthy, and Seetha kills Chakravarthy in turn. The film ends with Seetha committing suicide by jumping off a waterfall with Ramu's body.

Cast

Vishnupriyan as Ramu
Shraddha as Seetha
Shravan as Chakravarthy
Kadhal Vijay as Saravanan
Delhi Ganesh as Seenu, Seetha's father
Rajyalakshmi as Mangalam, Seetha's mother
Anjali Devi as Ramu's mother
Soori as "Blade" Balu
Ruksha as Suzan
S. Bhuvaneswari as Suzan's mother
Munnar Ramesh as Aadhi
Vaiyapuri as Tata Birla
R. Sundarrajan
Srikala Paramasivam as Raji, Seetha's sister
Rajendranath as SP Ali Khan
K. S. Jayalakshmi as Meenakshi
Ramya as Mallika
Muthukaalai

Production
Jaykumar made his directorial debut with Unakkaga En Kadhal, a college-based triangular love story based on an incident in the director's life. Vishnupriyan, who acted in films like Ilakkanam (2006) and Ninaithale Inikkum (2009), was chosen to play the hero while, newcomer Shravan was selected to play an important role. Newcomer Shraddha, a Keralite brought up in Mumbai, signed to play the heroine role. Actress Simran was Shraddha's neighbour in Mumbai, and it was her that advised Shraddha to try out in the Tamil film industry. Utpal V. N. took care of camera works while Sanjeev–Darshan scored the music and the editing was handled by K. Rajagopal.

Soundtrack

The film soundtrack was composed by Sanjeev–Darshan. The soundtrack, released in 2010, features five tracks with lyrics written by Piraisoodan.

References

2010 films
2010s Tamil-language films
2010 romantic drama films
Indian romantic drama films
Films scored by Sanjeev Darshan
2010 directorial debut films